Marius Căta-Chiţiga (born 13 February 1960) is a retired Romanian volleyball player who won a bronze medal at the 1980 Summer Olympics.

Căta-Chițiga started playing volleyball in 1972 at the Sports School in Timișoara and in 1974 won a national junior title. In 1975 he moved to Poli Timișoara and in 1977 to Dinamo București. With Dinamo he won the 1979 CEV Cup and ten national titles. Between 1992 and 1994 he played in Greece for Panellinios Atena, and after returning to Romania competed for Rapid Bucuresti. He retired after the 1996 season to become a volleyball coach and official.

References

1960 births
Living people
Romanian men's volleyball players
Olympic volleyball players of Romania
Volleyball players at the 1980 Summer Olympics
Olympic bronze medalists for Romania
Olympic medalists in volleyball
Sportspeople from Timișoara
Romanian emigrants to France
Naturalized citizens of France
Medalists at the 1980 Summer Olympics